The Ron Berteling Schaal has been held as the opening game of the Eredivisie season since 2007. It is contested by the previous season's Eredivisie and Dutch Cup champions (or the cup finalist, if a team won both the league and the cup).

The game is named after Ron Berteling, the most-capped player for the Dutch national ice hockey team.

Winners
The cup champion (or finalist) is the home team, while the Eredivisie winner is the away team.

(* Was cup finalist.)

References

External links
Nederlandse IJshockey Bond

Ice hockey competitions in the Netherlands